Ronald J. Duhamel,  (March 2, 1938 – September 30, 2002) was a Canadian Member of Parliament and Senator.

Biography

Ronald Duhamel was born in Saint Boniface, Manitoba, he obtained a Bachelor of Arts (BA) from Lakehead University and a Master of Arts (MA) and Ph.D. from the University of Toronto. He was a teacher, school principal, professor at the University of Manitoba, assistant deputy minister of education, and deputy minister of education in Manitoba. He died of cancer on September 30, 2002, survived by his wife Carolyn and three daughters, Kathie, Natalie and Karine.

Political career

Duhamel was elected as a Liberal candidate in the riding of Saint Boniface in the 1988 federal election. He was re-elected in 1993, 1997 and 2000. Duhamel was wildly popular in the riding and never won an election with less than 50% of the vote, winning each of his elections by 52%, 63%, 51% and 52%.

In 2000, Duhamel was appointed to the federal Cabinet by Prime Minister Jean Chrétien to the portfolio of Veterans Affairs, a post he held until 2002. Other posts he held include Parliamentary Secretary to the Minister of Public Works (Public Works and Government Services), Parliamentary Secretary to the President of the Treasury Board, Secretary of State (Science, Research and Development), Secretary of State (Western Economic Diversification), and Secretary of State (Francophonie).

Duhamel was appointed to the Senate on January 15, 2002, representing the senatorial division of Manitoba.

Electoral history

References 

 
 Debates of the Senate (Hansard), 2nd Session, 37th Parliament, Volume 140, Issue 3

1938 births
2002 deaths
Canadian senators from Manitoba
Franco-Manitoban people
Lakehead University alumni
University of Toronto alumni
Liberal Party of Canada MPs
Liberal Party of Canada senators
Members of the 26th Canadian Ministry
Members of the House of Commons of Canada from Manitoba
Members of the King's Privy Council for Canada
People from Saint Boniface, Winnipeg
Politicians from Winnipeg
Academic staff of the University of Manitoba